The 2010–11 Tercera División was the fourth tier of football in Spain. Play started on 27 August 2010 and the season ended on 26 June 2011 with the promotion play-off finals.

Overview
There were 360 clubs competing in  Tercera División (Third division) in the 2010–11 season, divided into 18 regional groups, accommodating between 19 and 21 clubs.

The following clubs finished as champions of their respective groups

Grupo I (Galicia) - Cerceda
Grupo II (Asturias) - Marino
Grupo III (Cantabria) - Noja
Grupo IV (País Vasco) - Amorebieta
Grupo V (Cataluña) - Llagostera
Grupo VI (Comunidad Valenciana) - Valencia Mestalla
Grupo VII (Comunidad de Madrid) - Alcobendas Sport
Grupo VIII (Castilla & León) - Burgos
Grupo IX (Andalucía Oriental (Almería, Granada, Jaén & Málaga) & Melilla) - Comarca de Níjar
Grupo X (Andalucía Occidental (Cádiz, Córdoba, Huelva & Sevilla) & Ceuta) - Linense
Grupo XI (Islas Baleares) - Manacor
Grupo XII (Canarias) - Lanzarote
Grupo XIII (Región de Murcia) - Costa Cálida
Grupo XIV (Extremadura) - Villanovense
Grupo XV (Navarra) - Tudelano
Grupo XVI (La Rioja) - Náxara
Grupo XVII (Aragón) - Andorra
Grupo XVIII (Castilla-La Mancha) - Toledo

The 18 group champion clubs participated in the Group winners promotion play-off and the losers from these 9 play-off ties then proceeded to the Non-champions promotion play-off with clubs finishing second third and fourth.

League standings

Group I - Galicia

Group II - Asturias

Group III - Cantabria

Group IV - Basque Country

Group V - Catalonia

Group VI - Valencian Community

Group VII - Community of Madrid

Group VIII - Castilla and León

Group IX - Eastern Andalusia and Melilla

Group X - Western Andalusia and Ceuta

Group XI - Balearic Islands

Group XII - Canary Islands

Group XIII - Region of Murcia

Group XIV - Extremadura

Group XV - Navarra

Group XVI - La Rioja

Group XVII - Aragón

Group XVIII - Castilla-La Mancha

Key

Promotion play-offs

Group winners promotion play-off 

Promoted to Segunda División B: Marino de Luanco, Villanovense, Valencia Mestalla, Burgos, Amorebieta, Toledo, Llagostera, Andorra and Linense.

Non-champions promotion play-off 

Promoted to Segunda División B:Reus Deportiu, Olímpic Xàtiva, Manacor, Sp. Villanueva, Arandina, S.S. Reyes, Sestao River, Gimn. Segoviana and La Roda.

External links
 Real Federación Española de Fútbol
Futbolme.com
Lapreferente.com

 
Tercera División seasons
4
Spanish